Jennifer Curtin is a New Zealand public policy academic, and a full professor at the University of Auckland.

Academic career

After a 1997 PhD titled  'Women in trade unions : strategies for the representation of women's interests in four countries'  at the Australian National University, Curtin moved to the University of Auckland, rising to full professor. Curtin is a frequent political columnist in the New Zealand and international media.

Selected works 
 Curtin, Jennifer. A digital divide in rural and regional Australia?. Department of Parliamentary Library, 2001.
 Curtin, Jennifer. Women and trade unions: A comparative perspective. Routledge, 2018.
 Curtin, Jennifer. "Women, political leadership and substantive representation: The case of New Zealand." Parliamentary Affairs 61, no. 3 (2008): 490–504.
 Costar, Brian J., and Jennifer Curtin. Rebels with a cause: independents in Australian politics. UNSW Press, 2004.

References

External links
 
 
 Jennifer Curtin on Australian politics (the Spinoff)

Living people
New Zealand women academics
Year of birth missing (living people)
Australian National University alumni
Academic staff of the University of Auckland
Australian emigrants to New Zealand
New Zealand women writers